Springlake-Earth High School is a public high school located  east of Earth, Texas, United States and classified as a 1A school by the UIL. It is part of the Springlake-Earth Independent School District located in north central Lamb County and serves students from the cities of Springlake and Earth. In 2015, the school was rated "Met Standard" by the Texas Education Agency.

History
Although the school was founded as Springlake in 1924, the Earth Cack of Commerce in 1966 offered to buy a lighted sign to be placed on Highway 70 indicating the location of the school if the name of the school were changed to include Earth. The board of trustees agreed, and in that same year, the name "Springlake-Earth" was adopted.

Athletics
The Springlake-Earth Wolverines compete in these sports - 

Basketball
Cross country
Football
Golf
Tennis
Track and field
Baseball

State titles
Girls basketball 
1967(1A), 1968(1A)

State finalists 
Girls basketball 
1966(1A)

State semifinalists
Boys basketball 
1995(2A)

References

External links
Springlake-Earth ISD

Schools in Lamb County, Texas
Public high schools in Texas